Frederick Hotham Andrus (August 23, 1850 – November 10, 1937) was an outfielder and pitcher in Major League Baseball for the Chicago White Stockings. In 1876 he played 8 games in the outfield, batting .306 in 36 at bats. In 1884, he played one game, pitching a complete game win on July 4 against the Philadelphia Quakers, allowing two earned runs.

He previously played for a club in Jackson, Michigan, called the Mutuals in 1875, while working for a newspaper. After playing for the White Stocking in 1876, he played for a Milwaukee team in 1877, and stayed there to work as a clerk in a book store. He moved to Chicago in 1884 to be the treasurer for Albert Spalding's sporting goods company, a position he held for eight years. He joined David Whitney Jr.'s real estate company in Detroit, later managing his estate until his death of pneumonia at the age of 87. He was initially interred at Woodlawn Cemetery in Detroit, but was later re-interred at Oak Woods Cemetery in Chicago.

References

External links

1850 births
1937 deaths
Chicago White Stockings players
Major League Baseball pitchers
Major League Baseball outfielders
Baseball players from Michigan
19th-century baseball players
Deaths from pneumonia in Michigan
Minor league baseball managers
Milwaukee (minor league baseball) players